Bölcek is a town in Bergama district of İzmir Province, Turkey.

References

Populated places in İzmir Province
İzmir Province
Towns in Turkey
Bergama District